First Lady or First Gentleman of Alaska is the title attributed to the wife or husband of the governor of Alaska. The holder of the title resides with the governor at the Alaska Governor's Mansion in Juneau, Alaska. 

The current first lady of Alaska is Rose Newlin, wife of Governor Mike Dunleavy, who has held the position since December 3, 2018. To date, only one person has served as the first gentleman since statehood: Todd Palin from 2006 to 2009.

First ladies and gentlemen of Alaska since statehood

References